Fort Frye High School is a public high school near Beverly, Ohio, United States. It is the only high school in the Fort Frye Local School District. Athletic teams compete as the Fort Frye Cadets in the Ohio High School Athletic Association as a member of both the Ohio Valley Athletic Conference and Twin State League.

District profile

There are three active Elementary Schools in the Fort Frye Local Schools District:  Beverly-Center Elementary, Lowell Elementary (Lowell, Ohio), and Salem-Liberty Elementary (Lower Salem, Ohio). Beverly was renamed to Beverly-Center in 2007 after the closing (due mainly to budgetary reasons) of Center Elementary (Hackney, Ohio). Most remaining Center students are now bused to Beverly-Center Elementary.  Current superintendent is Dr. Stephanie Starcher.  Principals include: Andy Schob at the high school, Krista Ross (Lowell & Salem-Liberty), and Megan Miller (Beverly-Center).

Students and teachers at Fort Frye High School often refer to the school as "The Fort", referencing the pioneer fortification, Fort Frye, built by settlers for protection during the Northwest Indian War.

References

External links
 District Website
 District Official Twitter

High schools in Washington County, Ohio
Public high schools in Ohio
Public middle schools in Ohio